Hobson is a ghost town in White Pine County, Nevada, United States, in or near Ruby Valley.  Hobson is the site of Fort Ruby, a National Historic Landmark.

History 
Fort Ruby, near Hobson was established in 1862 to protect the Overland Trail's important connection between California and the Union States during the American Civil War.  It was located at the east entrance to the Overland Pass into Ruby Valley.

References 

Ghost towns in White Pine County, Nevada
Ghost towns in Nevada
Great Basin National Heritage Area